John McIndoe may refer to:

 John McIndoe (minister) (1934–2022), minister of the Church of Scotland
 John McIndoe (printer) (1858–1916), New Zealand printer
 John McIndoe (artist) (1898–1995), New Zealand artist and printer
 John McIndoe (musician), British singer, guitarist and actor